900 Rosalinde (prov. designation:  or ) is an elongated background asteroid from the inner regions of the asteroid belt, that has a mean-diameter of approximately . It was discovered on 10 August 1918, by astronomer Max Wolf at the Heidelberg-Königstuhl State Observatory in southwest Germany. The lengthy S/D-type asteroid has a rotation period of 16.6 hours. It was likely named after "Rosalinde", a character in the operetta Die Fledermaus by Johann Strauss II.

Orbit and classification 

Rosalinde is a non-family asteroid of the main belt's background population when applying the hierarchical clustering method to its proper orbital elements. It orbits the Sun in the inner asteroid belt at a distance of 2.1–2.9 AU once every 3 years and 11 months (1,421 days; semi-major axis of 2.47 AU). Its orbit has an eccentricity of 0.16 and an inclination of 12° with respect to the ecliptic. The body's observation arc begins at Heidelberg-Königstuhl State Observatory with its official discovery observation on 10 August 1918.

Naming 

This minor planet was probably named after the character "Rosalinde", Eisenstein's wife, in the operetta Die Fledermaus by Johann Strauss II (1825–1899), after whom 4559 Strauss was named. Rosalinde's maid in the operetta, "Adele", is likely the namesake chosen by Wolf for another asteroid, 812 Adele. Lutz Schmadel, the author of the Dictionary of Minor Planet Names learned about the discoverer's source of inspiration from private communications with Dutch astronomer Ingrid van Houten-Groeneveld, who worked as a young astronomer at the discovering Heidelberg Observatory.

Physical characteristics 

Rosalinde is an S-type/D-type in the SMASS-I spectral type-classification by Xu (1995), which surveyed and classified a total of 221 objects. However, Rosalindes classification, with its moderate albedo of 0.1 (see below) does not correspond to more modern taxonomies such as the Bus–Binzel SMASS classification (II), where the bright S-types and the dark D-types do not have intermediate albedos.

Rotation period 

In June 2011, a rotational lightcurve of Rosalinde was obtained from photometric observations by Meaghann Stoelting and David DeGraffat at the Stull Observatory  of the Alfred University in New York. Lightcurve analysis gave a rotation period of  hours with a brightness variation of  magnitude. Assuming an equatorial view, the observers also constrained the object's elongated shape to be at least 36% longer than wide. The result supersedes a tentative period determination by French amateur astronomer René Roy from May 2007. Additional observation by the Spanish OBAS group gave a period of  hours with an amplitude of  magnitude.

In 2016, a modeled lightcurve gave a concurring sidereal period of  hours using data from the Uppsala Asteroid Photometric Catalogue, the Palomar Transient Factory survey, and individual observers (such as above), as well as sparse-in-time photometry from the NOFS, the Catalina Sky Survey, and the La Palma surveys . The study also determined two spin axes of (276.0°, 70.0°) and (90.0°, 39.0°) in ecliptic coordinates (λ, β).

Diameter and albedo 

The Collaborative Asteroid Lightcurve Link assumes an albedo of 0.0931 and calculates a diameter of 18.75 kilometers based on an absolute magnitude of 11.83. On 7 June 2015, an asteroid occultation gave a best-fit ellipse dimension of 19.0 × 19.0 kilometers. These timed observations are taken when the asteroid passes in front of a distant star.

References

External links 
 Lightcurve Database Query (LCDB), at www.minorplanet.info
 Dictionary of Minor Planet Names, Google books
 Asteroids and comets rotation curves, CdR – Geneva Observatory, Raoul Behrend
 Discovery Circumstances: Numbered Minor Planets (1)-(5000) – Minor Planet Center
 
 

000900
Discoveries by Max Wolf
Named minor planets
Johann Strauss II
19180810